Terry Lee McMillan (October 12, 1953 – February 2, 2007) was an American country musician who played harmonica and percussion. In 1973, he became a member of Eddy Raven's band in Nashville, and worked with Raven until 1974. McMillan then started working with Chet Atkins, playing harmonica with his touring show. Later, he toured with Jerry Reed and Jeannie C. Riley before becoming a very in-demand session musician. In the 1970s, McMillan appeared on many albums, including the recordings of Mickey Newbury and Gary Stewart. He was also featured many times on Trinity Broadcasting in the 1990s.

Career
Chet Atkins signed Terry as a solo artist for RCA Records in the early 1980s, charting at number 85 on Hot Country Songs with "Love Is a Full Time Thing". He returned to being a session musician, appearing live with, and on numerous albums for, artists including Ray Charles, Dolly Parton, Willie Nelson, Don Williams, Garth Brooks, George Jones, Hank Williams Jr., Merle Haggard, Reba McEntire, Randy Travis, Johnny Cash, Kris Kristofferson, Roy Orbison, Kenny Chesney, Emmylou Harris, Neil Young, Waylon Jennings, Brooks & Dunn, J. J. Cale, Trisha Yearwood, Amy Grant, Gaither Homecoming and many others. In 1993, he played at President Bill Clinton's inaugural ball, with David Pack’s (Ambrosia) All Star Band, giving a solo harmonica performance of "Amazing Grace". He recorded an album for Step One Records in 1993, with Nashville's Christ Church Choir. McMillan became one of country music's most popular session and in demand musicians on harmonica and percussion of all time.

After his family's house was destroyed in a 1992 house fire, McMillan became a devout Christian and focused extensively on inspirational music. In 1993, he released his first album, I've Got a Feeling, on Step One Records. He also released an album for Giant Records, Somebody's Comin in 1997. In the years that followed, he became a frequent guest on Christian television programs.
He died of congestive heart failure and pneumonia on February 2, 2007, and is buried in Smoky Mountain Memory Gardens in Pigeon Forge, Tennessee.

Discography

Albums
{| class="wikitable plainrowheaders"
|-
! style="width:12em;"| Title
! style="width:18em;"| Details
|-
! scope="row"| I've Got a Feeling
|
 Release date: August 31, 1993
 Label: Step One Records
|-
! scope="row"| Somebody's Comin'''
|
 Release date: February 11, 1997
 Label: Giant Records
|}

Singles
{| class="wikitable"
|-
! Year
! Single
! width="50"|US Country
! Album
|-
| 1981
| "All I Really Want to Do"
| align="center"| —
| rowspan="2"| singles only
|-
| 1982
| "Love is a Full Time Thing"
| align="center"| 85
|-
| 1993
| "I've Got a Feeling"
| align="center"| —
| I've Got a Feeling|-
| 1997
| "Somebody's Comin'"
| align="center"| —
| Somebody's Comin
|}

 Collaborations 
 New Harvest...First Gathering - Dolly Parton (1977)
 Grasshopper - J. J. Cale (1982)
 Age to Age - Amy Grant (1982)
 Heartbreak Express - Dolly Parton (1982)
 Great Hits of the Past - Chet Atkins (1983)
 Dangerous - Tony Joe White (1983)
 Once in a Very Blue Moon - Nanci Griffith (1984)
 Old Ways - Neil Young (1985)
 I 2 (EYE) - Michael W. Smith (1988)
 Take It to Heart - Michael McDonald (1990)
 Go West Young Man - Michael W. Smith (1990)
 Tennessee Woman - Tanya Tucker (1990)
 Love Is Strange - Kenny Rogers (1990)
 Carry On - Patti Austin (1991)
 What Do I Do with Me - Tanya Tucker (1991)
 Back Home Again - Kenny Rogers (1991)
 Change Your World - Michael W. Smith (1992)
 King of Hearts - Roy Orbison (1992)
 Slow Dancing with the Moon - Dolly Parton (1993)
 Shania Twain - Shania Twain (1993)
 Tell Me Why - Wynonna Judd (1993)
 Take Me as I Am - Faith Hill (1993)
 House of Love - Amy Grant (1994)
 Return to Pooh Corner - Kenny Loggins (1994)
 Something Special - Dolly Parton (1995)
 All I Want - Tim McGraw (1995)
 All I Need to Know - Kenny Chesney (1996)
 Revelations - Wynonna Judd (1996)
 Blue - LeAnn Rimes (1996)
 Golden Heart - Mark Knopfler (1996)
 All That Matters - Michael Bolton (1997)
 Behind the Eyes - Amy Grant (1997)
 Live the Life - Michael W. Smith (1998)
 Faith - Faith Hill (1998)
 The Trouble with Angels - Juice Newton (1998)
 No Place That Far - Sara Evans (1998)
 Breathe - Faith Hill (1999)
 Blue Obsession'' - Michael McDonald (2000)

Notes

1953 births
2007 deaths
American session musicians
American percussionists
American country harmonica players
American country drummers
People from Lexington, North Carolina
RCA Records artists
Step One Records artists
Giant Records (Warner) artists
20th-century American drummers
American male drummers
Country musicians from North Carolina
20th-century American male musicians